John Robert Beames (1 March 1890 – fourth ¼ 1970) was a Welsh rugby union, and professional rugby league footballer who played in the 1910s and 1920s.

Background
Jack Beames was born in Aberbeeg, Wales, and he died aged 80 in Halifax, West Riding of Yorkshire, England.

Rugby union playing career
Beames, who was born in Aberbeeg, originally played rugby union for Newport RFC, his most notable match being the club's victory over the touring South African team in 1912. In the 1912/13 season at Newport he played in 38 games scoring a single try.

Rugby league playing career

International honours
Jack Beames won a cap for Other Nationalities (RL) while at Halifax, won 2 caps for Wales (RL) in 1914–1921 while at Halifax, and won caps for Great Britain (RL) while at Halifax in 1921 against Australia (2 matches).

Challenge Cup Final appearances
Jack Beames played left-, i.e. number 11, in Halifax's 0-13 defeat by Leigh in the 1920–21 Challenge Cup Final during the 1920–21 season at The Cliff, Broughton on Saturday 30 April 1921, in front of a crowd of 25,000.

Club career
Jack Beames changed code from rugby union to rugby league when he transferred from Newport RFC to Halifax for £100 (based on increases in average earnings, this would be approximately £37,430 in 2016), he made his début for Halifax on Saturday 6 September 1913, and he played his last match for Halifax on Monday 11 December 1922.

Honoured at Halifax
Jack Beames died in Halifax, and is a Halifax Hall Of Fame Inductee.

References

External links
!Great Britain Statistics at englandrl.co.uk (statistics currently missing due to not having appeared for both Great Britain, and England)
Image "Jack Beames - Another player tempted out of retirement by the ailing Birch Lane club was Jack Beames who played for a season aged 33 in 1923. - Date: 01/01/1923" at rlhp.co.uk

1890 births
1970 deaths
Bradford Bulls players
Footballers who switched code
Great Britain national rugby league team players
Halifax R.L.F.C. players
Newport RFC players
Other Nationalities rugby league team players
Rugby league players from Caerphilly County Borough
Rugby league second-rows
Rugby union players from Aberbeeg
Wales national rugby league team players
Welsh rugby league players
Welsh rugby union players